Russell F. Freeman (born October 25, 1939) is an American diplomat and attorney. He served as United States Ambassador to Belize from 2001 to 2005.

Early life
Freeman was born in Fargo, North Dakota on October 25, 1939. He graduated from Grinnell College in Grinnell, Iowa in 1961, and received a J.D. from Northwestern University School of Law in 1964. He served in the Judge Advocate General's Corps, United States Army for four years after attending The JAG School at the University of Virginia.

Career
Freeman was a senior partner, director and president of the law firm Nilles, Hansen & Davies, Ltd., of Fargo, ND for thirty-two years. He was also an attorney for the North Dakota Supreme Court. From 2001 to 2005, he served as U.S. Ambassador to Belize.

References

1939 births
Living people
Lawyers from Fargo, North Dakota
Grinnell College alumni
Northwestern University Pritzker School of Law alumni
United States Army Judge Advocate General's Corps
Ambassadors of the United States to Belize
The Judge Advocate General's Legal Center and School alumni